Scrobipalpa bazae is a moth in the family Gelechiidae. It was described by Povolný in 1977. It is found on the Canary Islands and in Spain and southern France.

The forewings are light brownish with brown groups of scales are blackish flecks arranged longitudinally. The hindwings are light graphite grey.

References

Scrobipalpa
Moths described in 1977
Taxa named by Dalibor Povolný